Symmeria is a genus of plants in the family Polygonaceae with a single species, Symmeria paniculata, distributed in South America as well as western Africa. It is morphologically variable and dioecious, with male and female flowers on separate individuals.

References

Monotypic Polygonaceae genera
Dioecious plants
Polygonaceae